The Southern Oregon Timberjacks were a minor league baseball team in the northwest United States, based in Medford, Oregon.  The team played in the Class A-Short Season Northwest League and were an affiliate of the Oakland Athletics for 21 seasons.  They played their home games at Miles Field in south Medford.

Team history
The Timberjacks came to Medford to fill the void left by the departed Medford Giants (1967–1968) and Rogue Valley/Medford Dodgers (1969–1971), both of the Northwest League.  Originally known as the Bend Timber Hawks for a season in 1978, owner Doug Emmans relocated the team south and it became the Medford Athletics (or A's) in 1979.

A name change to Southern Oregon Athletics (or A's) came in 1988, and then a new nickname of Timberjacks in 1996 for their last four seasons.  They were six-time southern division champions (1981–1984, 1988–1989) and won the league championship twice (1981 and 1983). In 1982, Medford had the highest winning percentage of any team in professional baseball. 

In 1982, former minor league pitcher Fred Herrmann was named the team's general manager and then became the team's majority owner in 1985.

As a minor league baseball franchise, the A's and Timberjacks had featured future major league players such as Greg Cadaret, José Canseco, Rod Beck, Scott Brosius, Jason Giambi, Tim Hudson, Terry Steinbach, Jason Windsor, Miguel Tejada, and Eric Byrnes.

Relocation controversy and stadium demise
In 1997 and 1998, Herrmann had announced that the team would relocate to Vancouver, Washington.  However, the plans fell through on both occasions and the team remained in Medford.

Finally on October 26, 1999, Herrmann announced that the franchise would relocate to Vancouver, British Columbia, and in 2000, they completed their move and were renamed the "new" Vancouver Canadians. The previous Canadians franchise was the Athletics'  Class AAA Pacific Coast League affiliate, which was sold and moved to California and became the Sacramento River Cats.  Both teams continued to be affiliated with the Oakland A's until 2011, when the Canadians became affiliated with the Toronto Blue Jays.  The current Canadians do not show any history or records of the Timberjacks at their official website, though their relocation is mentioned one time on the media guide page.

Herrmann did attempt to bring a Western Baseball League team to Medford to replace the Timberjacks (Despite long standing rules that prohibited affiliated owners having a financial interest in independent baseball teams).  However, those plans fell through when the potential owners, including Herrmann, failed to come up with the money necessary to establish a team. After four years without a professional team and despite efforts to rebuild and restore historic Miles Field, the city of Medford ordered the deteriorating stadium be torn down in 2004 to make way for a new Wal-Mart SuperCenter.

In 2004, the city council of Medford orchestrated an agreement with the new Harry & David Field that a professional team will not be allowed to play at the new ballpark which currently hosts the collegiate wood bat Medford Rogues, the American Legion baseball Medford Mustangs and youth baseball.  Despite previous efforts to bring pro baseball back to Medford, the decision stands to this day. The agreement is a moot point as the Northwest League has stated that Medford is not a city that would be considered for expansion.

Season-by-season record

Notable alumni

 Rod Beck (1986-1987) 3 x MLB All-Star

 Mike Bordick (1986) MLB All-Star

 Scott Brosius (1987) MLB All-Star; 1998 World Series Most Valuable Player

 Eric Byrnes (1998)

 Greg Cadaret (1983)

 Jose Canseco (1983) 6 x MLB All-Star; 1986 AL Rookie of the Year; 1988 AL Most Valuable Player

 Ron Coomer (1987) MLB All-Star

 Jason Giambi (1992) 5 x MLB All-Star; 2000 AL Most Valuable Player

 Ben Grieve (1994) MLB All-Star; 1998 AL Rookie of the Year

 Tim Hudson (1997) 4 x MLB All-Star; 222 Wins

 Gerald Laird (1999)

 Charlie O'Brien (1982)

 Steve Ontiveros (1982) MLB All-Star; 1994 AL ERA Title

 Craig Paquette (1989)

 Lenn Sakata (1988, MGR)

 Scott Spiezio (1994) 

 Terry Steinbach (1983) 3 x MLB All-Star

 Kevin Tapani (1986)

 Miguel Tejada (1995) 6 x MLB All-Star; 2002 AL Most Valuable Player

 Todd Van Poppel (1990)

 Dave Veres (1986)

 Luis Vizcaino (1997)

 Curt Young (1981)

Former players
Medford A's players   (1979–1987)
Southern Oregon A's players   (1988–1995)
Southern Oregon Timberjacks players   (1996–1999)

References

External links
 Southern Oregon Timberjacks Minor League Geek
 Southern Oregon Timberjacks' original website (archive.org)
 Southern Oregon Timberjacks' profile at Minor League baseball website (1998) (archive.org)
 Southern Oregon Timberjacks year-by-year records, statistics and rosters at The Baseball Cube
 Northwest League Team History (1990–1997)
 Northwest League Team History (1998–2005)

Defunct Northwest League teams
Sports in Medford, Oregon
Defunct baseball teams in Oregon
Oakland Athletics minor league affiliates
Professional baseball teams in Oregon
1978 establishments in Oregon
1999 disestablishments in Oregon
Baseball teams established in 1978
Baseball teams disestablished in 1999